Le Plein de Super (also known as Fill 'er Up with Super) is a 1976 French comedy and drama film directed by Alain Cavalier. The musical score was composed by Étienne Chicot. The film is starring Patrick Bouchitey, Étienne Chicot, Bernard Crombey, Xavier Saint-Macary and Béatrice Agenin in the lead roles.

Cast
 Patrick Bouchitey as Daniel
 Étienne Chicot as Charles
 Bernard Crombey as Klouk 
 Xavier Saint-Macary as Philippe
 Béatrice Agenin as Agathe
 Nathalie Baye as Charlotte
 Catherine Meurisse as Camille
 Valérie Quennessen as Marie

References

External links
 
 

1976 films
1970s French-language films
1976 comedy-drama films
French comedy-drama films
1976 comedy films
1976 drama films
1970s French films